Gerrish Newell (May 26, 1873 – October 10, 1941) was an American college football player and coach, banker, and military officer. He served as the head football coach at Trinity College in Hartford, Connecticut for one season, in 1901, compiling a record of 1–6–1.

Newell grew up in Great Barrington, Massachusetts and was the younger brother of Marshall Newell, an All-American for the Harvard Crimson football team in the early 1890s. The younger Newell also attended Harvard University, playing as an end on the football team in 1895 before graduating in 1898.

Newell was vice president of the First National Bank and Trust Company of Kearny, New Jersey. He joined the New Jersey National Guard in  1909 was later promoted to the rank of major after serving as a supply officer with the 113th Infantry Regiment during World War I. Newell died on October 10, 1941, at his home in Arlington, New Jersey, following a 10-month illness.

Head coaching record

References

External links
 

1873 births
1941 deaths
19th-century players of American football
American bankers
American football ends
Harvard Crimson football players
Trinity Bantams football coaches
United States Army personnel of World War I
United States Army officers
People from Great Barrington, Massachusetts
People from Kearny, New Jersey
Coaches of American football from Massachusetts
Players of American football from Massachusetts
Military personnel from Massachusetts
Military personnel from New Jersey
Sportspeople from Berkshire County, Massachusetts